Livingstone-Macleod is a provincial electoral district in Alberta, Canada. The district is one of 87 current districts in the province mandated to return a single member to the Legislative Assembly of Alberta using the first past the post method of voting.

The electoral district located in rural southwestern Alberta was created with minimal boundary changes in the 1997 boundary re-distribution from the old riding of Pincher Creek-Macleod. The district is named after Mount Livingstone and the town of Fort Macleod. The district also contains the communities of Pincher Creek and the municipality of the Crowsnest Pass.

The district and its antecedent have been favorable to electing Progressive Conservative candidates in the past few decades, but this history was broken in the 2012 Alberta general election when Wildrose candidate Pat Stier was elected.

History
The electoral district was created in the 1996 boundary redistribution primarily from the old electoral district of Pincher Creek-Macleod.

Significant changes were made to the district in the 2010 boundary redistribution. The Blood Reserve was transferred to the electoral district of Cardston-Taber-Warner while land south of the town of High River that was in Highwood as well as a portion of land in that constituency in the north west and the portion of land that was part of the abolished Foothills-Rocky View electoral district south of Tsuu T'ina Nation was transferred into the electoral district.

Boundary history

Electoral history

The electoral district was created in the 1997 boundary redistribution. The election held that year saw  Pincher Creek-Macleod Progressive Conservative incumbent David Coutts win more than half the popular vote over Liberal candidate Ernie Patterson to pick up the seat for his party.

The two would face each other again in the 2001 general election. Coutts would be re-elected with a larger majority to win his third term in office. Coutts won his fourth term in the 2004 election taking just over half of the popular vote in the riding. He retired from office at dissolution of the assembly in 2004.

The second representative of the district was Progressive Conservative MLA Evan Berger; elected to his first term in the 2008 general election.

Legislature results

1997 general election

2001 general election

2004 general election

2008 general election

2012 general election

2015 general election

2019 general election

Senate nominee results

2004 Senate nominee election district results
Voters had the option of selecting 4 Candidates on the Ballot

2012 Senate nominee election district results

Student Vote results

2004 election

On November 19, 2004 a Student Vote was conducted at participating Alberta schools to parallel the 2004 Alberta general election results. The vote was designed to educate students and simulate the electoral process for persons who have not yet reached the legal majority. The vote was conducted in 80 of the 83 provincial electoral districts with students voting for actual election candidates. Schools with a large student body that reside in another electoral district had the option to vote for candidates outside of the electoral district then where they were physically located.

2012 election

References

External links 
Website of the Legislative Assembly of Alberta

Alberta provincial electoral districts